Cardy may refer to:

Cardigan (sweater), a type of knit shirt than has an open front
Cardy (surname)
Cardy, Missouri, United States
Cardy Site, United States, National Register of Historic Place

See also

Caddy (disambiguation)
Cardi, surname